Honduran Spanish is the Spanish language as spoken in the country of Honduras in Central America. Voseo is routinely used in Honduras.

Phonology
  is at times elided in contact with front vowels.
  is often aspirated or elided in word- or syllable-final position. As an apparent extension of this, it may even be aspirated in word-initial or word-medial, syllable-initial environments. This word-medial aspiration is most common near morpheme boundaries, and in the pronoun . S-reduction is most common in the north of Honduras. It is less common in areas of Copán Department near the Guatemalan border, in Comayagua, and among the upper classes of Tegucigalpa.

Local words
These words are some slang words used in Honduras. Some may also be used in neighboring El Salvador and elsewhere.
Bululo - bread roll
Trucha or pulpería - corner shop
Relajo - mess
Jura or chepo - police patrol
Posta - police station
Maje - dude
Cipote(a) - kid (male, when it ends with "e"; and female, when it ends with "a")
Güirro(a) - kid (male, when it ends with "o"; and female, when it ends with "a")
Juco(a) - Dirty person (male, when it ends with "o"; and female, when it ends with "a")
Colocho - Curls (in reference to hair)
Chongo - Bow (gift wrapping)
Encachimbar - to annoy/upset 
Bolo - Drunk
Goma - Hangover 
Paila - A bucket. Also used to refer to a pick up truck (Carro Paila)
Pisto/Billullo - Money
Chabacán - Trouble Maker
Guachimán - Security guard (Comes from the English word, Watchman)

References

Languages of Honduras
Central American Spanish